Burunoba is a village in the central district (Karaman) of Karaman Province, Turkey. It is situated to the east of Karadağ, an extinct volcano. The population of the village was 226 as of 2011. The village was founded in 1873 by Turkmens. The main economic activity is agriculture.

References

Villages in Karaman Central District